The Publius Enigma is an Internet phenomenon and an unsolved problem that began with cryptic messages posted by a user identifying only as "Publius" to the unmoderated Usenet newsgroup alt.music.pink-floyd through the Penet remailer, a now defunct anonymous information exchange service. The messenger proposed a riddle in connection with the 1994 Pink Floyd album The Division Bell, promising that the answer would lead to a reward.

Guitarist David Gilmour denied any involvement, while album artist Storm Thorgerson was bemused. According to drummer Nick Mason, EMI Records were responsible. It remains unclear if the enigma involves a genuinely solvable puzzle as part of an early Internet-based contest or was a convoluted hoax.

History
During the 1994 Division Bell World Tour, Columbia Records flew a  airship named The Division Belle between Pink Floyd concert locations. The Columbia Electronic Press Kit was released to the media, along with the Promo Spots Video consisting of interviews with band members, footage of the airship in action, and a segment which contained the following:

On 11 June 1994, a user of the anonymous Penet remailer service posted the following message to the Usenet newsgroup "alt.music.pink-floyd"

>>>>>>>> T H E  M E S S A G E <<<<<<<<

My friends,

You have heard the message Pink Floyd has delivered,
but have you listened?

Perhaps I can be your guide, but I will not solve the enigma for you.

All of you must open your minds and communicate with each other,
as this is the only way the answers can be revealed.

I may help you, but only if obstacles arise.

Listen.

Read.

Think.

Communicate.

If I don't promise you the answers would you go.

     Publius

A follow-up clarified the challenge:

AS SOME OF YOU HAVE SUSPECTED, "The Division Bell" is not like its
predecessors. Although all great music is subject to multiple
interpretations, in this case there is a central purpose and a
designed solution. For the ingenious person (or group of persons)
who recognizes this - and where this information points to - a
unique prize has been secreted.

    How and Where?
    The Division Bell
    Listen again
    Look again
    As your thoughts will steer you
    Leading the blind while I stared out the steel
      in your eyes.
    Lyrics, artwork and music will take you there

In order to refute the ensuing scepticism, Publius agreed to provide proof of his authenticity. On 16 July 1994 he delivered a prediction:

To validate the trust of those who believe, as well as
to reconcile the doubt of others, I have gone to great
lengths to plan the following display of communication:

Monday, July 18
East Rutherford, New Jersey
Approximately 10:30pm

Flashing white lights.

There is an enigma.

Trust.

On the night of 18 July 1994, patterns in the lights on the front of the stage at the Pink Floyd concert in East Rutherford momentarily spelled out the words ENIGMA PUBLIUS.

In September 1996, the Penet remailer service was shut down by its creator over legal threats posed to the guaranteed anonymity of its users. As a consequence, contact to the newsgroup through the associated Publius account ceased. Subsequent Publius-style posts from other addresses have led to differing opinions over the status of the enigma and whether or not it has ever been solved.

Official statements
During a 2002 webchat, guitarist David Gilmour said the puzzle was "some silly record company thing that they thought up to puzzle people with". In April 2005, during a book signing of his biographical work Inside Out: A Personal History of Pink Floyd, drummer Nick Mason affirmed that it had been instigated by the record company:

The comments made by Mason corroborate parts of a previous interview by Sean Heisler with Marc Brickman, Pink Floyd's lighting and production designer and the man apparently responsible for putting the "ENIGMA PUBLIUS" message in the lights at the New Jersey concert.

Douglas Adams, who was credited with having given the album its title, categorically denied any knowledge or involvement and dismissed the idea of the band members being responsible:

Uncle Custard
The Pink Floyd magazine Brain Damage had a Q&A section reserved for a correspondent known only as "Uncle Custard". The name (phonetically similar to "Uncool Car Stud") was created by Glen Povey, apparently an allusion to Nick Mason's passion for auto racing.

Issue No.34 of the magazine contains the following:

Although the answers given by Uncle Custard over the years have all been written by several different people affiliated with the magazine, this particular response has been attributed to former editor and final publisher of the printed version of Brain Damage Jeff Jensen. The accuracy of the content of this answer and under what authority (if any) Jensen had to produce it remains unclear.

In the media
Possible references to the Publius Enigma can be found in various Pink Floyd releases:
Pulse, a DVD of the 20 October 1994 televised concert at Earls Court, London, contains footage of the word "ENIGMA" being projected in large letters on to the backdrop of the stage during the song "Another Brick in the Wall (Part II)". The DVD's authoring company, Das Boot, uses an enigma machine as their logo, which can be seen at the end of the show.
 In the 2019 re-edit of Pulse included in "The Later Years" box set, different camera angles are substituted so that the "ENIGMA" projection is less prominent. You can still see "MA" in one shot, and the bottom of "IGMA" in another, but the prominent wide-shot which clearly said "ENIGMA" appears to have been deliberately removed.
In the artwork for the MiniDisc release of A Momentary Lapse of Reason, the word "PUBLIUS" has been inserted into the photo of the man in the rye field. The word "ENIGMA" appears in the lower corner of the picture of the man standing on the edge of the cliff.
The words "Publius Enigma" are spoken just before the song "One of These Days" on the 2003 DVD release of Pink Floyd: Live at Pompeii.
Storm Thorgerson's cover for John Harris' book The Dark Side of the Moon: The Making of the Pink Floyd Masterpiece includes the following text: "[...] despite numerous attempts to elucidate the mysteries of its success, the ubiquitous popularity of this record remains an enigma..."
Page 13 of The Division Bell'''s CD booklet contains an anagram of the word "enigma" in the third column from the right of the top verse of the lyrics to Wearing the Inside Out, aligned with the page number "jyusan". Anthony Moore, who wrote the lyrics to the song, has denied that this was intentional on his part.
The official Pink Floyd biography contains the statement "[...] true to their beginnings, there has always been an enigma at their heart" and ends with "For at the heart of Pink Floyd, there has always been an enigma..."
The Ian Emes movie The Endless River'' (2019) that can be found in The Later Years box shows the words Publius Enigma at the end of the second Allons-Y song.

See also
Publius (disambiguation)
Polybius

References

External links
alt.music.pink-floyd @ Google Groups The original discussion forum
alt.music.pink-floyd.publius @ Google Groups The Publius Enigma subforum
The Messages Sent by Publius
Publius Enigma: some history of the matter by Mark Brown
Pink Floyd and the Publius Enigma by Eric Spierings
The Division Bell Concept
A Guide to the Publius Enigma by Cordelia
The Publius Enigma by Nicholas Palffy

Pink Floyd
Viral marketing
Puzzle hunts
Puzzles
Open problems
Works of unknown authorship
1994 introductions
Internet mysteries
Usenet people